The 1950 SMU Mustangs football team represented Southern Methodist University (SMU) as a member of the Southwest Conference (SWC) during the 1950 college football season. Led by first-year head coach Rusty Russell, the Mustangs compiled an overall record of 6–4 with a mark of 2–4 in conference play, tying for fifth place in the SWC. SMU played home games at the Cotton Bowl in Dallas. Kyle Rote and Bobby Collier were the team captains.

Schedule

References

SMU
SMU Mustangs football seasons
SMU Mustangs football